was a Japanese actor and voice actor, known for his roles as Matthew Cuthbert in Anne of Green Gables, Old Man in Tokyo Godfathers, and Dwarf in The Wonderful Adventures of Nils.

Saikachi died from congestive heart failure on September 29, 2017.

Filmography

Anime television
GeGeGe no Kitarō (1968) – Nurarihyon
Tensai Bakabon (1971) – Rerere no Ojisan
Doraemon (NTV anime) (1973)
Anne of Green Gables (1979) – Matthew Cuthbert
Space Adventure Cobra (1983) – Dr. Magellan
Maison Ikkoku (1986) – Kyoko Otonashi's father-in-law
YuYu Hakusho (1992) – Dr. Ichigaki
Dragon Ball Z (1993) – Daikaiō
Little Women II: Jo's Boys (1993) – Silas
Rurouni Kenshin (1996) – Márquez Murakami
Sakura Wars (2000) – Gontarō Iwai
InuYasha (2002) – Taigokumaru
Monster (2004) – Deniz

Original video anime
Legend of Lemnear (1989) – Sendoshi
Mermaid Saga (1991) – Shiina
3x3 Eyes (1995) – Tinzin
Sakura Wars: The Radiant Gorgeous Blooming Cherry Blossoms (1999) – Gontarō Iwai

Anime films
Galaxy Express 999 (1979) – Bartender
Sero hiki no Gôshu (1982) – Concertmaster
Harmagedon: Genma taisen (1983) – Yogin
Uniko: Mahô no shima e (1983) – Trojan Horse
Night on the Galactic Railroad (1985) – Store Owner
Odin: Photon Sailer Starlight (1985) – Froi
Castle in the Sky (1986) – Old Engineer
The Wings of Honneamise (1987) – Prof. Ronta
Soju Senshi Psychic Wars (1991) – Elder
Sairento mebiusu 2 (1992) – Old Man
Tōi Umi kara Kita Coo (1993) – Old Amaku
Dragon Ball Z: Fusion Reborn (1995) – Grand Kaiô
A Tree of Palme (2002) – Sawadust
Tokyo Godfathers (2003) – The Old Man
Akage no An: Gurîn Gêburuzu e no michi (2010) – Matthew Cuthbert (final film role)

Video games
Kingdom Hearts II – Rafiki
Kingdom Hearts Birth by Sleep – Sneezy
Kingdom Hearts 358/2 Days – Geppetto

Tokusatsu
Ultraseven (1968) – Alien Badoo
Fight! Mighty Jack (1968) – Narrator
Kamen Rider (1971-1972) – Spider / Semiminga
Chibira-Kun (1972) – Mechara
Henshin Ninja Arashi (1972) – Tarantula
Mirroran (1972) – Invader
Kamen Rider V3 (1973) – Sickle-Neck Turtle
Kamen Rider X (1974) – Rebirth Medusa / Rebirth Salamander-Gong
The Five Riders vs. King Dark (1974) – Medusa / Cerberus
Kamen Rider Amazon (1974-1975) – Mole Beastman / Ten-Faced Demon Gorgos (human rock face)
Kamen Rider Stronger (1975) – Scorpion Kikkaijin
Akumaizer 3 (1975-1976) – Namazurn
The Kagestar (1976) – Tonbogiller / Kamikillar
Choujin Bibyun (1976) – Kasakappa
Daitetsujin 17 (1977) – Dr. Ackerman (Actor : Enveru Arutenbai)
Battle Hawk (1977) – Hitoraiyer
Kamen Rider Skyrider (1979) – Mukadenjin / Sanshoujin
Kamen Rider Super-1 (1979-1980) – Cassette Gomoru / Jishakugen
Kyodai Ken Byclosser (1985) – Battler

Live-action dubbing
Walter Brennan
My Darling Clementine (1969 TV Asashi edition) – Newman Haynes Clanton
Red River (1968 TV Asashi edition) – Nadine Groot
The Proud Ones (1973 Fuji TV edition) – Jake
Rio Bravo (1969 and 1973 TV Asashi editions) – Stumpy
The Cassandra Crossing – Herman Kaplan (Lee Strasberg)
Day of Anger – Blind Bill (José Calvo)
Dracula: Prince of Darkness – Ludwig (Thorley Walters)
The Empire Strikes Back (1980 Movie theater edition) – Wes Janson
A Fistful of Dollars (1971 TV Asashi edition) – Piripero (Joseph Egger)
Going My Way (1972 TV Asashi edition) – Father Fitzgibbon (Barry Fitzgerald)
The NeverEnding Story (1987 TV Asahi edition) – Engywook (Sydney Bromley)
The NeverEnding Story III (1996 TV Asahi edition) – Engywook (Tony Robinson)
The Muppet Christmas Carol - Waldorf
Muppet Treasure Island - Waldorf
The Rockford Files – Joseph "Rocky" Rockford (Noah Beery, Jr.)

Overseas animation dubbing
The Aristocats – Napoleon
The Black Cauldron – Doli
Lady and the Tramp – Jock
Lady and the Tramp II: Scamp's Adventure – Jock
The Lion King – Rafiki
The Lion King II: Simba's Pride – Rafiki
The Lion King 1½ – Rafiki
Peter Pan - Pirates Bill
Pinocchio – Geppetto
The Rescuers – Orville
Robin Hood – Sir Hiss
Snow White and the Seven Dwarfs – Sneezy
The Tick - Dr. J.J. Eureka Vatos
Wacky Races – Professor Pat Pending
Mune: Guardian of the Moon – Phospho (final voice work)

Other voices
Peter Pan's Flight at Tokyo Disneyland – Pirates Bill
Country Bear Theater at Tokyo Disneyland – Sieg

References

External links
 
 

1928 births
2017 deaths
Japanese male voice actors
Waseda University alumni
Male actors from Tokyo